Pat Callahan is a guitarist, best known for his work with the band Seether from October 2002 to June 2006.

During his career with Seether, Callahan received gold records for the band's successful work on the albums Disclaimer, Disclaimer II, Karma and Effect, The Punisher movie soundtrack, the Daredevil movie soundtrack, and has received a platinum award in Australia for the single, "Broken".

Since quitting Seether, Callahan has spent time working with children in a Philadelphia music school called the Music Training Center. He has also played and toured with Metallica, Evanescence, Audioslave, Green Day, Staind, Breaking Benjamin, Slipknot, 3 Doors Down, Shinedown, Def Leppard, and Lionel Richie.

In the past, Callahan has made several television appearances which have included MTV, The David Letterman Show, The Tonight Show with Jay Leno, Last Call with Carson Daly, and Jimmy Kimmel Live!. He was also featured in the April 2003 issue of Guitar World magazine.

References 

American rock guitarists
Living people
Year of birth missing (living people)
Seether members